The Singapore men's national under-18 basketball team represents the country in international under-18 (under age 18) basketball competitions. It is managed by the Basketball Association of Singapore (BAS), formerly the Singapore Amateur Basketball Association (SABA).

Current roster
Singapore roster at the 10th SEABA Under-18 Championship:

See also 
 Singapore men's national basketball team
 Singapore men's national under-16 basketball team
 Singapore women's national under-18 basketball team

References

External links

Basketball
Men's national under-18 basketball teams
Basketball teams in Singapore